Jerrold Immel (born 9 September 1936 in Los Angeles, California) is a United States television music composer, whose most famous works are the theme tune to the soap opera Dallas and Voyagers!.

Before moving into scoring, Immel worked as a music copyist at CBS, before getting his break into television scoring on Gunsmoke. Other programs which he has contributed music to include How the West Was Won, Hawaii Five-O, Logan's Run, Walker, Texas Ranger (through 1995 season) and Knots Landing. He has also composed music for films, including the scores to Matilda (1978), Death Hunt (1981), Sourdough (1981) and Megaforce (1982).

Television Scores (partial)
"Episode(s)" denotes the listing may be incomplete.

External links

 interview

1936 births
Living people
American television composers